

Events

January events 
 January 25 – The North Hudson County Railway in New Jersey opens the first elevated cable railway in the United States, the Hoboken Elevated.

February events 
 February 1 – The Mersey Railway opened to public traffic between Birkenhead and Liverpool by tunnel beneath the River Mersey, England.
 February 18 - The Kansas City, Memphis and Birmingham Railroad is incorporated in Mississippi.

March events 
 March–September – Great Southwest Railroad Strike, a labor union strike against the Union Pacific and Missouri Pacific railroads involving more than 200,000 workers.
 March 30 – Executives from several railroad companies operating in the southern United States meet and agree to all regauge their railroads to standard gauge, by June 1.

May events 
 May – The Atchison, Topeka and Santa Fe Railway takes control of the Gulf, Colorado and Santa Fe Railway.

July events 
 July 8 – Russian emperor Alexander III establishes Railway Worker Day as a national holiday on the anniversary of the name day of Nikolai I, who first commissioned Russian railroad construction.

August events 
 August 17 – The 7 mile (11.3 km) long Lakeside and Marblehead Railroad is incorporated in Ottawa County, Ohio.

September events 
 September 1 – Regular traffic (initially freight only) begins to pass through the Great Western Railway’s Severn Tunnel linking southern Gloucestershire and Monmouthshire.
 September 9 – The rail connection to Cape Tormentine, New Brunswick, is completed by a predecessor of the New Brunswick and Prince Edward Island Railway.

October events 
 October 18 – Between 5:00 AM and 6:00 PM, the St. Louis, Arkansas and Texas Railroad, a predecessor of the St. Louis Southwestern Railway, converts 418 miles (673 km) of track from narrow gauge to standard gauge.

November events 
 November 20 – The San Bernardino and Los Angeles Railway is incorporated as an Atchison, Topeka and Santa Fe Railroad subsidiary to build a rail connection between its namesake cities in California.

Unknown date events
 The first refrigerator cars on the Southern Pacific Railroad enter operation.
 The Southern Pacific Railroad wins the landmark Supreme Court case Santa Clara County v. Southern Pacific Railroad which establishes equal rights under the law to corporations.
 Grande Ceinture line around Paris completed.

Births

May births
 May 4 – Henry G. Ivatt, Chief Mechanical Engineer of the London, Midland and Scottish Railway (d. 1976).

Unknown date births 
 W. Graham Claytor, president of Southern Railway (US) (d. 1971).

Deaths

July deaths
 July 24 – Nathaniel Worsdell, English carriage builder (b. 1809).

December deaths 
 December 28 - William Kimmel, director for Baltimore and Ohio Railroad (b. 1812).

Unknown date deaths
 David Levy Yulee, Florida railroad executive (b. 1810).

References 
 Clowes, J. A.; Railways of Canada Archives (1999), Eastern New Brunswick's Railway History. Retrieved September 8, 2005.
 Morris, J. C., compiler (December 31, 1902), Annual report of the Commissioner of Railroads and Telegraphs; Part II, history of the railroads of Ohio. Retrieved August 16, 2005.
 Rivanna Chapter, National Railway Historical Society (2005), This Month in Railroad History: October. Retrieved October 18, 2005.
 Santa Fe Railroad (1945), Along Your Way, Rand McNally, Chicago, Illinois.